Marvel Next was a short lived imprint that was launched by the American comics publisher Marvel Comics in early 2005. Marvel's press release stated that Marvel Next was "not a new line or imprint" but rather "a collection of titles" intended to "spotlight young characters." Like the Tsunami imprint before it, it aimed to attract young readers. Marvel Next titles carried a "Marvel Next" tag on the cover, but not always in the typical imprint location near the regular Marvel logo. The title may have been an attempt to appeal to or identify with Generation Next.

The titles were set in the Marvel Universe and most of them (Araña: The Heart of the Spider, Young Avengers, Runaways and Amazing Fantasy) had connections to pre-existing titles, taking advantage of settings, characters and events from previous stories.

Logo Use
While the Marvel Next press release included Young Avengers and Runaways among the forthcoming Marvel Next books, neither series ever carried the Marvel Next logo. Of the series that did carry it, only X-23 and Araña Heart of the Spider displayed it for their entire runs. The logo was used from March 2005 through February 2006, exactly matching the run of Araña, imprint's longest lasting series.

Crossover

There was very little crossover between the various comics. Prior to the Civil War: Young Avengers/Runaways comic the Young Avengers and the Runaways had been mentioned in one another's comics.

The closest thing to a crossover centred on the fictional drug MGH. It appeared in numerous Marvel titles over the years previously and appeared in a two-part Young Avengers story in Autumn 2005. The following month, the Runaways were asked to fight the Pusher Man, an MGH dealer.

Gravity appeared in Marvel Team-Up, alongside other new heroes such as Araña and X-23, and Excelsior member Darkhawk.

In 2006, Marvel Comics published the crossover Civil War: Young Avengers/Runaways as part of the larger Civil War event.

Marvel Next titles

Ongoing (with logo on at least some issues)
Araña: The Heart of the Spider
Amazing Fantasy

Ongoing (press release mention only)
Runaways
Young Avengers

Miniseries (with logo on at least some issues)
Gravity
Livewires
Machine Teen
Spellbinders
X-23

See also
List of Marvel Digests

References

 
Marvel Next